The Trempealeau Formation is an Upper Cambrian geologic formation in Wisconsin.  It contains graptolites.

See also

 List of fossiliferous stratigraphic units in Wisconsin
 Paleontology in Wisconsin

References

Cambrian geology of Wisconsin
Cambrian southern paleotropical deposits